George W. Housner (December 9, 1910 in Saginaw, Michigan – November 10, 2008 in Pasadena, California) was a professor of earthquake engineering at the California Institute of Technology and National Medal of Science laureate.

Biography
Housner received his bachelor's degree in civil engineering from the University of Michigan where he was influenced by Stephen Timoshenko. He earned his masters' (1934) and doctoral (1941) degrees from the California Institute of Technology where he had been a professor of earthquake engineering from 1945 to 1981, and Professor Emeritus thereafter.

Annually, in recognition of those who made extraordinary contributions to the earthquake safety research, practices and policies, EERI awards The George W. Housner Medal of the Earthquake Engineering Research Institute. On his death, Housner left a substantial gift to EERI "to advance the objectives of EERI". This gift has been used to train future earthquake engineering policy advocates and thought leaders through the EERI Housner Fellows Program, which has been active since 2011.

Housner died of natural causes November 10, 2008 in Pasadena, California at the age of 97.

Partial list of achievements 

 Chairman of the earthquake engineering research committee of the National Academy of Sciences
 Formed the Earthquake Engineering Research Institute 
 UNESCO representative to International Institute of Seismology and Earthquake Engineering in Tokyo
 AEC advisory panel on safety against ground shock
 AID consultant at University of Roorkee, India
 Chairman of Geologic Hazards Advisory Committee for California State Resources Agency
 Chairman of Panel on Seismic Design and Testing of Nuclear Facilities for International Atomic Energy Agency
 On Los Angeles County Earthquake Commission 
 Member of Earthquake Engineering and Hazards Reduction Delegation to People's Republic of China
 Consultant to Japanese Atomic Energy Commission and Italian Nuclear Energy Commission and numerous nuclear energy projects in the U.S.
 Elected to National Academy of Sciences 1972
 Named Braun Professor of Engineering at Caltech 1974
 Chairman of NRC's Earthquake Society and International Association
 Delivered second Mallet-Milne memorial lecture for Society for Earthquake and Civil Engineering Dynamics in London, 1989

References

Further reading 
 
 
 
 
 

1910 births
2008 deaths
National Medal of Science laureates
20th-century American engineers
Structural engineers
Earthquake engineering
Members of the United States National Academy of Sciences
University of Michigan College of Engineering alumni